In the United States, the business band is the colloquial name used by radio users who utilize, and scanner hobbyists who listen to, the Federal Communications Commission (FCC) Industrial/Business pool frequencies. The regulations listing frequencies in this pool are contained in Subpart C of Part 90, Title 47 of the CFR.

Overview
The pool describes a series of frequencies on the VHF and UHF two-way radio bands. They are reserved for use by companies and individuals operating commercial activities; educational, philanthropic, or ecclesiastical institutions; clergy activities or hospitals, clinics, or medical associations. In the United States, use of these frequencies requires a license issued by the U.S. FCC.  The exceptions to this are five specific frequencies that are also part of the Multi-Use Radio Service (MURS), which permits unlicensed operation on these frequencies, provided the output power does not exceed 2 watts. Other frequency bands, such as citizens band radio (CB radio) and Family Radio Service (FRS), may also be used without a license.

Channels are available in several frequency ranges to suit the users' requirements for propagation and protection from interference. The electromagnetic spectrum between approximately 450 and 470 MHz is used largely for UHF business communications, although this spectrum is not exclusively for business use. In some large metropolitan areas, such as New York, the UHF-T band (between 470 and 512 MHz) is also used, due to congestion on the standard VHF or UHF bands. There are also a number of specific frequencies, in both the VHF and UHF spectrum, that are for business use; some of these have color-coded names, such as Red Dot or Blue Star.

In 2004, the FCC required all CFR 47 Part 90 VHF (150–174 MHz) and UHF (421–470 MHz) PLMR (Private Land Mobile Radio) licensees operating legacy wideband (25 kHz bandwidth) voice or data/SCADA systems to migrate to narrowband (12.5 kHz bandwidth or equivalent) systems by January 1, 2013.

History
The Private Land Mobile Radio Service (47CFR90, or Part 90 of the FCC Rules) was established in the US in 1927 to permit commercial and public safety uses of two-way radio by commercial entities and non-Federal government agencies. Similar allocations are available in other countries. The available frequencies in the US have traditionally been separated into two pools. One is for industrial and business users, including some special categories such as petroleum, manufacturing and forestry; the other is for public safety including medical, police, fire and others. The industrial and business frequencies, sometimes also known as "business band radio" and the eligibility requirements are listed in 47CFR90.35. Frequencies are licensed on a non-exclusive basis, although fixed stations and mobiles operating in a defined area are issued licenses only following frequency coordination to assure equitable sharing of bandwidth. Anyone conducting commercial business or a number of other activities is eligible for a license.

Other general-purpose two-way radio services with simplified licensing requirements have also been established over the years in the US including GMRS and CB, the latter now being licensed by rule, so that users don't need individual licenses. FRS and MURS are similar pools of frequencies that do not require individual licenses in the US.

Frequency charts
Although the term "business band" refers to several discrete frequencies that are not grouped into a single band, examples of some of the frequencies are grouped by band and listed below. These charts also list other frequencies not specifically part of the "business band" but commonly used by businesses. An individual license is still required under GMRS rules. A few manufacturers added these DOT frequencies to Business radios in the 1990s to have more "channels" and aid in selling radios. Part 90 (Business) and Part 95 (GMRS) frequencies are not interchangeable and are not to be used under the same guidelines. Each has different criteria for licensing. Part 95 GMRS frequencies are not "Itinerant", nor business band frequencies.

Low-band frequencies

VHF frequencies

UHF frequencies

References

External links
 FCC description of Wireless Bureau's Industrial/Business Pool
 Common Itinerant and Business Frequencies

Bandplans
Radio regulations